In enzymology, an oxalate decarboxylase is an oxalate degrading enzyme that catalyzes the chemical reaction

oxalate + H+  formate + CO2

Thus, the two substrates of this enzyme are oxalate and H+, whereas its two products are formate and CO2.

This enzyme belongs to the family of lyases, specifically the carboxy-lyases, which cleave carbon-carbon bonds.  The systematic name of this enzyme class is oxalate carboxy-lyase (formate-forming). This enzyme is also called oxalate carboxy-lyase.  This enzyme participates in glyoxylate and dicarboxylate metabolism.

Structural studies

References

 
 
 

EC 4.1.1
Enzymes of known structure